The 1987 All Japan Sports Prototype Car Endurance Championship was the fifth season of the All Japan Sports Prototype Championship. The 1987 champion was the #1 Advan Alpha Nova Porsche 962C driven by Kunimitsu Takahashi.

Schedule
All races were held in Japan.

Season results
Season results as follows:

Point Ranking

Drivers

Makes

References

External links
 1987 全日本スポーツプロトタイプカー耐久選手権 

JSPC seasons
All Japan Sports Prototype